Allan Lindsay Gorringe (20 January 1884 – 22 November 1918) was an English cricketer.  Gorringe's batting style is unknown.  He was born at Eastbourne, Sussex.

Gorringe made his first-class debut for Sussex against Middlesex.  He made three further first-class appearances for Sussex in 1905, the last of which came against Lancashire.  In his four first-class matches, he scored a total of 46 runs at an average of 7.66, with a high score of 16.  He later played a single Minor Counties Championship match for Cambridgeshire against Norfolk at Fenner's in 1914.

He died at Repton, Derbyshire on 22 November 1918.

References

External links
Allan Gorringe at ESPNcricinfo
Allan Gorringe at CricketArchive

1884 births
1918 deaths
Sportspeople from Eastbourne
English cricketers
Sussex cricketers
Cambridgeshire cricketers
People from Repton
Cricketers from Derbyshire